Mirjana Đurica (born 11 March 1961 in Sombor, Serbia, FPR Yugoslavia) is a former Yugoslav/Serbian handball player who competed in the 1980 Summer Olympics, in the 1984 Summer Olympics and in the 1988 Summer Olympics.

In 1980 she won the silver medal with the Yugoslav team. She played all five matches and scored one goal.

Four years later she won the gold medal as member of the Yugoslav team. She played all five matches and scored 18 goals.

In 1988 she was part of the Yugoslav team which finished fourth in the Olympic tournament. She played five matches and scored two goals.

External links
profile

1961 births
Living people
Sportspeople from Sombor
Yugoslav female handball players
Serbian female handball players
Handball players at the 1980 Summer Olympics
Handball players at the 1984 Summer Olympics
Handball players at the 1988 Summer Olympics
Olympic handball players of Yugoslavia
Olympic gold medalists for Yugoslavia
Olympic silver medalists for Yugoslavia
Olympic medalists in handball
Medalists at the 1984 Summer Olympics
Medalists at the 1980 Summer Olympics